Rollo was the founder and first ruler of the Viking principality in what soon became known as Normandy.

Rollo may also refer to:

Places
 Rollo Department, Burkina Faso
 Rollo, Burkina Faso, a town in Rollo Department
 Rollo, Illinois, United States, an unincorporated community 
 A common nickname for the city of Rovaniemi, Finland

Other uses
 Rollo (record producer), an English music producer
 Rollo (name), including lists of people and characters with the given name or surname
 Clan Rollo, a Scottish clan
 Lord Rollo, a title in the Peerage of Scotland
 "Rollo," a part of Frank Zappa's "Don't Eat the Yellow Snow" suite
 An Italian roll cake

See also
 
 Rolo, a chocolate-covered caramel candy
 Rolla (disambiguation)